In physics, the gravitomagnetic clock effect is a deviation from Kepler's third law that, according to the weak-field and slow-motion approximation of general relativity, will be suffered by a particle in orbit around a (slowly) spinning body, such as a typical planet or star.

Explanation
According to general relativity, in its weak-field and slow-motion linearized approximation, a slowly spinning body induces an additional component of the gravitational field that acts on a freely-falling test particle with a non-central, gravitomagnetic Lorentz-like force.

Among its consequences on the particle's orbital motion there is a small correction to Kepler's third law, namely

where TKep is the particle's period,  M is the mass of the central body, and a is the semimajor axis of the particle's ellipse.  If the orbit of the particle is circular and lies in the equatorial plane of the central body, the correction is
 where S is the central body's angular momentum and c is the speed of light in vacuum.

Particles orbiting in opposite directions experience gravitomagnetic corrections TGvm with opposite signs, so that the difference of their orbital periods would cancel the standard Keplerian terms and would add the gravitomagnetic ones.

Note that the + sign occurs for particle's corotation with respect to the rotation of the central body, whereas the − sign is for counter-rotation. That is, if the satellite orbits in the same direction as the planet spins, it takes more time to make a full orbit, whereas if it moves oppositely with respect to the planet's rotation its orbital period gets shorter.

See also

Introduction to general relativity
Gravitomagnetic time delay

References 

Clocks